Julia Leischik (born 14 October 1970) is a German television presenter, television producer and editor-in-chief.

Life 
Leischick grew up in Upper Palatinate (Cham), and is mother of one daughter.

Television career 
In autumn 2003 she went to the Endemol Deutschland GmbH, where they broadcast "Vermisst" (en: Missing) which she codeveloped and presented. Since the beginning of 2010 she was Executive Producer for "Vermisst' on RTL. From January till the middle of 2011 she presented "Verzeih mir" (en: Forgive me) and resembled "Vermisst".

For the season beginning  2011/2012  Leischik changed to Sat.1. There she became the face of the new show "Julia Leischik sucht: Bitte melde dich" (en: Julia Leischik searching: "Please get in touch"). The network also presented two episodes of the series "Zeugen gesucht — mit Julia Leischik" (en: Witnesses sought — with Julia Leischik)

References

External links
 
 Biographie from Julia Leischik on RTL.de

1970 births
Living people
German television presenters
German women television presenters
Television people from Cologne
RTL Group people